Silsako was an ancient stone bridge over a channel of river Barnadi (Bornadi) in Hajo, Kamrup. As the channel changed its course over time, now the bridge is stranded in the middle of a small lake. It was an important transit route in ancient and medieval times. Invaders like Muhammad bin Bakhtiyar Khalji entered into Kamrup in the year 1205-06 AD, and crossed the bridge Silsako. This historical bridge sustained damage in the 1897 Assam earthquake.

Hannay, who in 1851 saw and measured the bridge, wrote as follows:

See also
 Rock architecture in India

References

Stone bridges
Kamrup district
Bridges in Assam
Indian architectural history
Cultural history of Assam